American Epic: The Soundtrack is the soundtrack of the 2017 documentary film American Epic. The album features the 15 musical highlights from the documentary series recorded between 1927 and 2014.

Background 
The album was compiled by the American Epic film producers and co-writers Allison McGourty, Duke Erikson and director Bernard MacMahon to provide a brief overview of the music featured in the documentary series. The album features 13 songs recorded in the 1920s and 30s, an early 1960s gospel performance by Sister Rosetta Tharpe and a recording made for the film featuring the grandchildren of Amédée Breaux performing his song "Jole Blon" on the same instruments he and his brothers recorded it on in 1929. The album shares a number of selections with the 5-CD box set American Epic: The Collection.

Restoration 
New sound restoration techniques developed for the American Epic film series were utilized to restore the thirteen 1920s and 30s recordings on the album. The 78rpm record transfers were made by sound engineer Nicholas Bergh using reverse engineering techniques garnered from working with the restored first electrical sound recording system from the 1920s in The American Epic Sessions. This was followed by meticulous sound restoration by sound engineers Peter Henderson and Joel Tefteller to reveal greater fidelity, presence and clarity to these 1920s and 1930s recordings than had been heard before. Some of the recordings were repressed from the original metal parts, located whilst researching the films. Henderson explained, "in some cases we were lucky enough to get some metal parts – that's the originals where they were cut to wax and the metal was put into the grooves and the discs were printed from those back in the '20s. Some of those still exist – Sony had some of them in their vaults."

Release 
The album was released on May 12, 2017, a month prior to the broadcast of the American Epic documentary films. The album issued on vinyl, CD, and download.

Critical reception 

Robert Christgau in Noisey awarded the album an A grade and made it his number 5 Album of the Year. He described it as "a terrific new anthology of American folk music," and praised the compilation's ethnic and gender diversity writing "if this be political correctness, bring it on." The restoration work was described by Greil Marcus in The Village Voice as "re-mastering I can only call profound. Performances you might think you knew sound as if you've never heard them before — never apprehended them." Ian Anderson in fRoots, reviewing the restoration wrote "you haven't really heard these tracks at all. Not like this. Forget bad dubs of worn-out 78s pressed on poor vinyl. The 'reverse engineering' transfers by Nicholas Bergh and subsequent restorations are so startlingly better, practically everything you will ever have experienced from this era can be discounted and CD is the best way to hear them. The clarity of group recordings where every instrument is well defined, and of solo artists where their instruments and voices suddenly sound real, will have you on the edge of your seat. And there's none of that fog of 78 surface noise which many people find too much of a distraction: suddenly, legendary artists are in the room with you".

Track listing

Personnel 

 Ervin Williamson – vocals, guitar (track 1)
 Arnold Williamson – vocals, fiddle (track 1)
 Arnold Curry – banjo (track 1)
 Kirk – backing vocals (track 1)
 Will Shade – guitar, vocal (track 2) harmonica (track 9)
 Ben Ramey – kazoo (track 2), kazoo, vocal (track 9)
 Charlie Burse – guitar, vocals (track 2) guitar (track 9)
 Jab Jones – jug (track 2)
 Mississippi John Hurt – vocals, guitar (track 3)
 Sara Carter – vocals, autoharp (track 4)
 Maybelle Carter: vocal, guitar (track 4)
 A. P. Carter – vocals (track 4)
 Lydia Mendoza – vocals, guitar (track 5)
 Dock Walsh – banjo, vocals (track 6)
 Clarence Ashley – guitar, vocals (track 6)
 Garley Foster – harmonica, guitar (track 6)
 Sol K. Bright – vocals, steel guitar (track 7)
 Ray Kinney – vocals, ukulele (track 7)
 Henry Hall – fiddle (track 8)
 Harold Hall – vocals (track 8)
 Clarence Hall – guitar (track 8)
 Hattie Hart – vocals (track 9)
 Hambone Lewis – jug (track 9)
 Sister Rosetta Tharpe – vocals, guitar (track 10)
 Olivet Institutional Baptist Church Choir – handclaps
 Charley Patton – vocals, guitar (track 11)

 Joseph Falcon – vocals, accordion (track 12)
 Cléoma Breaux – guitar (track 12)
 Frank Hutchison – vocals, guitar, harmonica (track 13)
 Jimmie Rodgers – vocals (track 14)
 C. L. Hutchison – cornet (track 14)
 James Rickard – clarinet (track 14)
 John Westbrook – steel guitar (track 14)
 Dean Bryan – guitar (track 14)
 George MacMillan – string bass (track 14)
 Pat Breaux – accordion (track 15)
 Gary Breaux – accordion (track 15)
 Jimmy Breaux – accordion (track 15)
 Louis Michot – vocals, fiddle (track 15)
 Ann Savoy – guitar (track 15)
 Ashlee Michot – tit-fer (track 15)
 Allison McGourty – compiler, producer, liner notes, music supervisor
 Bernard MacMahon – compiler, producer
 Duke Erikson – compiler, producer, mastering
 Nicholas Bergh – 78rpm transfers, mastering
 Peter Henderson – restoration, mastering, producer
 Joel Tefteller – restoration, mastering
 John Polito – mastering
 Ellis Burman – mastering
 Patrick Ferris – associate producer
 Jack McLean – associate producer
 Nat Strimpopulos – artwork

References

Notes

Bibliography 
 Wald, Elijah & McGourty, Allison & MacMahon, Bernard. American Epic: The First Time America Heard Itself. New York: Touchstone, 2017. .

External links 
 Official website

2017 soundtrack albums
Documentary film soundtracks
Rock soundtracks
Country music soundtracks
Folk soundtracks
Blues soundtracks
Spanish-language soundtracks
Folk albums by American artists